John Amadeus Devenanzio (born June 22, 1982), also known as Johnny Bananas, is a television personality, best known as a competitor on the MTV reality game show The Challenge. His first television appearance was on the seventeenth season of The Real World in 2006. In 2018, he became the host of 1st Look on NBC.

Television appearances

The Challenge
Devenanzio is the most decorated and one of the most infamous contestants on The Challenge. He is known for a multitude of infamous moments on The Challenge such as keeping the $275,000 earnings from winning partner, Sarah Rice, in Rivals 3 and being hoisted on the back of Chris Tamburello during an elimination in Cutthroat.  As of 2022, he has won the most seasons of The Challenge with seven seasons and has earned the second highest amount of prize money of all contestants on the competition show accumulating $1,184,720. He also holds the record for the most seasons participated in with twenty seasons. He has also competed in spin-offs of The Challenge such as Champs vs. Pros and Champs vs. Stars respectively.

Personal life
After filming for the thirty-third season of The Challenge had completed, Devenanzio started dating castmate and Big Brother: Over the Top winner Morgan Willett. The couple split in September 2021 after Willett claimed Devenanzio was unfaithful. Devenanzio was previously in a relationship with Olympic champion Hannah Teter.

Filmography

Television

Film

References

External links

1982 births
Living people
The Real World (TV series) cast members
The Challenge (TV series) contestants